The Women's 60 m wheelchair 2 was one of the events held in Athletics at the 1972 Summer Paralympics in Heidelberg.

There were 9 competitors in the heat; 5 made it into the final.

Sitar of Yugoslavia won the gold medal.

Results

Heats

Final

References 

Wheelchair